The 22989/22990 Bandra Terminus–Mahuva Express is a Superfast train belonging to Western Railway zone that runs between  and  in India. It is currently being operated with 22989/22990 train numbers on a weekly basis.

Service

22989/Bandra Terminus–Mahuva Express has an average speed of 57 km/hr and covers 883 km in 15h 25m.
22990/Mahuva–Bandra Terminus Express has an average speed of 56 km/hr and covers 883 km in 15h 45m.

Route and halts 

The important halts of the train are:

Schedule

Coach composition

The train has standard LHB rakes with max speed of 130 kmph. The train consists of 16 coaches:

 1 AC II Tier
 1 AC III Tier
 9 Sleeper coaches
 3 General Unreserved
 2 End-on Generator

Traction 

After Ahmedabad Junction, both trains are hauled by a Locomotive shed, Vatva-based WDM-3A diesel locomotive up to Mahuva Junction, and vice versa.

Rake Sharing Arrangement(RSA) 

The train shares its rake with 22993/22994 Bandra Terminus–Mahuva Superfast Express and 22991/22992 Bandra Terminus–Veraval Superfast Express

See also 

 Mahuva Junction railway station
 Bandra Terminus railway station

Notes

References

External links 

 22989/Bandra Terminus - Mahuva Express India Rail Info
 22990/Mahuva - Bandra Terminus Express India Rail Info

Transport in Mumbai
Express trains in India
Rail transport in Maharashtra
Rail transport in Gujarat
Railway services introduced in 2017